Won Soo-yeon (born January 12, 1961) is a South Korean female manhwa artist who writes in the shoujo (romance) genre. She debuted in 1987 and has published several titles; among her best known serials are Full House (2002) and its sequel Full House 2 (2005). Two of her comics have been adapted into television dramas: Full House (2004) and Mary Stayed Out All Night (2010).

She is married to fellow manhwa artist Doha Kang, with whom she has two children.

Works
Elio and Yvette (1992)
Let Dai (1995)
Confession (manhwa anthology) (1999)
Full House (2002)
I Want You (2003)
Full House 2 (2005)
The Devil's Trill (2006)
Mary Stayed Out All Night (2009)

Adaptions of work
Mary Stayed Out All Night
Full House (2004)

Awards

State honors

Notes

References

External links

1961 births
South Korean manhwa artists
South Korean manhwa writers
Living people
South Korean female comics artists
South Korean women artists
Female comics writers